Hassocks & Burgess Hill South is an electoral division of West Sussex in the United Kingdom, and returns one member to sit on West Sussex County Council.

Extent
The division covers the southwestern part of the town of Burgess Hill and the villages of Clayton, Hassocks and Keymer.

As of 2017 it comprises the southern part of Meeds ward (Burgess Hill) along with the Hammonds Ridge estate (Burgess Hill) and Hassocks Ward.

Election results

2017 Election
Results of the election held on 4 May 2017:

References

External links
 West Sussex County Council
 Election Maps

Electoral Divisions of West Sussex